The term bombshell is a forerunner to the term "sex symbol" and originally used to describe popular women regarded as very attractive. The Online Etymology Dictionary by Douglas Harper attests the usage of the term in this meaning since 1942. Bombshell has a longer history in its other, more general figurative meaning of a "shattering or devastating thing or event" since 1860.

History 

The first woman to be known as a bombshell was Jean Harlow, who was nicknamed the "blonde bombshell" for her film Platinum Blonde (1931). Two years later, she starred in the Metro-Goldwyn-Mayer film Bombshell (1933). One of the blurbs on posters was "Lovely, luscious, exotic Jean Harlow as the Blonde Bombshell of filmdom."

Hollywood soon took up the blonde bombshell, and then, during the late 1940s through the early 1960s, brunette, exotic, and ethnic versions (e.g., Jane Russell, Dorothy Dandridge and Sophia Loren) were also cultivated as complements to, or as satellites of, the blonde bombshell. Some of the movie stars, largely of the 1940s–1960s, referred to as bombshells include Marilyn Monroe, Rita Hayworth, Diana Dors, Jayne Mansfield, Mamie Van Doren, Jane Russell, Ava Gardner, Carroll Baker, Brigitte Bardot, Kim Novak, Julie Christie, Sophia Loren, Elizabeth Taylor, Ann-Margret, Veronica Lake, Raquel Welch, Ursula Andress, and Gina Lollobrigida

The epithet rose sharply in popularity after the death of Marilyn Monroe in 1962, and declined in popularity in the late 1960s due to emerging ideological conflicts.

Stereotype 
Bombshells are identified with hypersexuality, their curves, including hourglass figures and large breasts, sex appeal, larger than life personas, as well as stereotypes associated with blonde women and supermodels.

See also 
 Pin-up model
 Sexual attraction

References 

Erotica
Stereotypes of women
Slang terms for women